James Brodie  (31 August 1820 – 19 February 1912) was an Australian cricketer. He played three first-class cricket matches for Victoria.

In 1851 Brodie played in the first inter-colonial cricket match in Australia representing Victoria against Tasmania in Launceston and top-scoring with an innings of 17. He was among the first cricketers to play in first-class matches between Victoria and New South Wales, having personally read the proclamation separating the states in 1852. In 1862 he represented Australia in a match against the first English XI to tour the country.

By the 1880s Brodie had moved to River Murray, South Australia, where he was growing willows. As of 1882 he had moved to Port Augusta where he patented a spring-handle cricket bat. At some point he returned to Victoria where he regularly attended matches at the Melbourne Cricket Ground well into his old age. He was reportedly the oldest Australian cricketer at the time of his passing in 1912.

See also
 List of Victoria first-class cricketers

References

1820 births
1912 deaths
Australian cricketers
Cricketers from Perth, Scotland
Melbourne Cricket Club cricketers
Victoria cricketers
Scottish emigrants to colonial Australia